Heck is a civil parish in the English county of North Yorkshire. The population of this civil parish at the census 2011 was 201, a slight drop on the 2001 census figure of 209.

For the purposes of local administration Heck forms part of the district of Selby; before April 1974 it was part of Osgoldcross Rural District and the West Riding of Yorkshire. It was the location of the fatal Selby rail crash in February 2001.

References

Civil parishes in North Yorkshire
Selby District